Wechselburg is a municipality in the district of Mittelsachsen, in Saxony, Germany. It is well known for its twelfth century Benedictine monastery, the Wechselburg Priory.

The lordship and the castle were owned by the House of Schönburg from 1546 until 1945.

Personalities

Sons and daughters of the community 
 Karl Schlegel (aviator) (1893–1918), pilot in the First World War

Persons in connection with the municipality 
 Martin Keller (athlete) (born 1986), athlete (sprinter)

References 

Mittelsachsen